Movement of animals may refer to:

Movement of Animals, a text by Aristotle
Animal locomotion
Transportation of animals